Rollbocks, sometimes called transporter trailers, are narrow gauge railway trucks or bogies that allow a standard gauge wagon to 'piggyback' on a narrow-gauge line. The Vevey system enables a coupled train of standard gauge wagons to be automatically loaded or rolled onto Rollbocks, so that the train can then continue through a change of gauge.

The system uses a pair of narrow gauge (750 or 1,000 mm) rails laid in a pit that is built in the middle of a standard gauge track, which is elevated by about 30 cm. It allows the Rollbock bogies to sit underneath the standard gauge tracks and as the Rollbock train is pulled out of the Rollbock siding each bogie picks up one axle of a standard gauge wagon as it rises out of the Rollbock pit. Thus two Rollböcke are needed for a twin-axle wagon. They were a development of the transporter wagon (Rollwagen), designed to keep cost and weight down by avoiding the need for a complete wagon.

History 
The original invention goes back to the Rollwagen of the Schweizer Maschinenfabrik Winterthur (Swiss Locomotive and Machine Works, Winterthur) or SLM patented in 1880. It is a simple system for light loads that found applications even when the superior Langbein system was invented in 1881 by the Maschinenfabrik Esslingen (Esslingen Engineering Works) named after Paul Langbein being the director of the facilities in Saronno, Italy.

The Langbein system uses pairs of claws which are folded up laterally by hand, to form a yoke around the axles of the standard gauge bogies. When the bogies are pulled out of the pit the standard gauge wheels can sink onto the Rollbock to find support.

In 1974 a refinement of the concept was developed for the Yverdon–Ste-Croix railway in Switzerland. Unlike the Langbein system, the Vevey system requires no manual intervention to fix the standard gauge axles over the narrow gauge bogies. In this system, rather than the axle being supported, the wheel flanges of the wagons are cradled in brackets projecting from the side of the Rollbock. This lowers the centre of gravity and increases stability. Many modern Rollbock users have converted to the Vevey System. The Vevey Technologies company was bought by Bombardier in 1998.

Use 
They are used extensively in Switzerland and in Spain, in the latter country to transport standard gauge vehicles on broad gauge lines.

They are also in use on the Harz Narrow Gauge Railways to transport limestone from the Unterberg quarry to Nordhausen, where they are transferred to the DB system at a pit between the station and Hesseröderstraße. Trains are diesel-hauled and typically consist of 12  Fccpps ballast hopper wagons from Voestalpine Railpro; the Rollböcke are painted bright pink.

Until the 1990s the Rollbock sidings at Wernigerode were used every day to transport goods to and from the various metallurgical factories attached to the  Harz Narrow Gauge Railways in the immediate area. Similarly it was used extensively on the Saxon narrow gauge system west of Dresden to transport china clay to Meissen.

Using rollbock technology requires that the narrower gauge network must be built to a structure gauge large enough to accommodate the loading gauge of standard gauge wagons, and that negates one of the cost advantages of narrower gauge construction. The system was tested for the narrow gauge railways in Saxony around 1900 but it found only rare application - tracks requiring higher transport capacity were rebuilt to  instead. However it is also possible to use the wagons of the narrow gauge loading gauge type built with standard gauge axles which allows them to run at full speed on standard gauge tracks, piggybacking them on the short section in the mountains by Rollbock bogies. This application requires that the receiver of the freight is able to unload those wagons, so they have found only limited use.

Gallery

See also
 Break of gauge
 Dual gauge
 Bogie exchange
 Transporter wagon
 Narrow gauge railways in Saxony

References

Bibliography 
 Jackson, Alan A. (2006). The Railway Dictionary, 4th ed., Sutton Publishing, Stroud. .

External links
 Video of Rollböcke in use between Unterberg and Nordhausen (detail of unloading at minute 20)

Rail infrastructure
Freight rolling stock